Manguaba Lagoon (Portuguese Lagoa Manguaba) is an estuarine lagoon in Alagoas state of northeastern Brazil. Manguaba Lagoon receives the Paraíba do Meio River, and is connected to the Atlantic Ocean to the east and Mundaú Lagoon to the north by a network of channels.

Estuaries of Brazil
Landforms of Alagoas
Lagoons of Brazil